The Smědá is a river of the Czech Republic and Poland. A right tributary of the Neisse River with a length of 51.9 km (5.9 km within Poland) and basin area 331 km2 (60 km2 in Poland).

The river flows out of the three streams in the Jizera Mountains: Bílá Smědá, Černá Smědá, and Hnědá Smědá, in the Czech Republic. The main of those is considered Bílá Smědá emerging from the peat bogs between Smědavská and Jizera mountains. From the village of Ostróżno to the mouth of the stream Boreczek it is a border river, flows through Niedów Lake (Witka Lake), and escapes to the Neisse River next to the palace in the village Radomierzyce.

The final section of the river within the limits of the Czech Republic creates a nature reserve Smědé Meanders (Witka Meanders) to protect the natural landscape of the river valley, rich vegetation and wetland meanders riparian forests.

In Poland the name Witka was officially introduced in 1951, replacing the German name Wittig.

Tributaries 

Right
 Šindelový potok
 Hájený potok
 Libverdský potok
 Pekelský potok
 Lomnice
 Řasnice
 Bulovský potok
 Kočičí potok

Left
 Bílý potok
 Černý potok
 Velký a Malý Štolpich
 Holubí potok
 Andělský potok
 Minkovický potok
 Višňovský potok
 Boreček (Boreczek)

Notes and references

Rivers of the Liberec Region
Rivers of Poland
Rivers of Lower Silesian Voivodeship
Czech Republic–Poland border
International rivers of Europe
Border rivers